Britton may refer to:

 Britton (law), an ancient summary of the Laws of England
 Britton (given name)
 Britton (surname)

Places

Canada
 Britton, Ontario

United States
 Britton, Michigan
 Britton, Oklahoma
 Britton, South Dakota

See also
Britten (disambiguation)
Briton (disambiguation)